George Richard Pullinger (14 March 1920 – 4 August 1982) was an English cricketer.  Pullinger was a right-handed batsman who bowled right-arm fast-medium.  He was born in Islington, London.

An amateur, Pullinger made his first-class debut for Essex against Middlesex in the 1949 County Championship as cover for Ken Preston.  Available for only the first half of the 1949 season, he made fifteen further appearances.  He played twice more in the 1950 season, then disappeared from first-class cricket.  He often opened the bowling with Trevor Bailey. In his eighteen first-class matches he took 41 wickets at an average of 37.97, with best figures of 5/54.  These figures, which were his only first-class five wicket haul, came against Somerset in 1949.  A true tailender, with the bat he scored 53 runs at a batting average of 5.88, with a high score of 14 not out.

He died at Thurrock, Essex on 4 August 1982.  His obituary appeared in the 1986 edition of Wisden Cricketers' Almanack.

References

External links
George Pullinger at ESPNcricinfo
George Pullinger at CricketArchive

1920 births
1982 deaths
People from Islington (district)
Cricketers from Greater London
English cricketers
Essex cricketers